Lukáš Nachtman (born 11 May 1984) is a Czech former footballer.

Career
Nachtman began his career with Tempo Prague and joined Junior Praha in 1997, where he played for one year, signing for Slavia Prague in 1998. He played for the reserve team of Slavia before making his début for the senior side on 2 August 2003 against Chmel Blšany. In 2004 Nachtman joined Blšany on loan. Nachtman subsequently returned to Slavia before signing for Slovak side Rimavská Sobota on 28 February 2008. He left the club after six months and signed for Slovan Bratislava on 16 June 2008 and later signed a loan deal with Artmedia Petržalka in February 2009.

International
Nachtman played for his homeland Czech Republic at under-17 level, later also playing for the under-19s and under-20s.

References

External links

 ||&name=Lukas+Nachtman IM Scouting Profile

1984 births
Living people
Footballers from Prague
Czech footballers
Association football defenders
SK Slavia Prague players
FK Chmel Blšany players
ŠK Slovan Bratislava players
FC Petržalka players
MŠK Rimavská Sobota players
OŠK Moravany nad Váhom players
FC Neded players
ŠK Blava Jaslovské Bohunice players
Czech First League players
Slovak Super Liga players
Czech Republic youth international footballers
Czech expatriate footballers
Expatriate footballers in Slovakia
Czech expatriate sportspeople in Slovakia